Flute beatboxing (or fluteboxing) is an extended technique of the flute, or an extension in sound resonators for beatboxing. Involving the production of distinct and stereoscopic flute tones (producing two separate sounds by humming while blowing into the flute) combined with vocal percussion and aural prestidigitation (sleight-of-ear), flute beatboxing enables the use of the flute as a rhythmic instrument.

RadioActive has been credited as the original flute-beatboxer (using a pan flute, and performing with the Spearhead around the world), and Tim Barsky with being an innovator on a classical Boehm system flute. Both artists came out of the Bay Area hip-hop scene.

The technique was shaped by Nathan "Flutebox" Lee and Chrys Pyro; Lee has performed with such groups as The Prodigy, Asian Dub Foundation, and his own band The Clinic. 

Greg Pattillo developed a system of essentially traditional notation for flute beatboxing, with one staff for the flute and another for the percussive effects, the latter similar to that for drum kits since beatboxing is based on the three sounds of the hi-hat, snare rimshot, and bass drum. - 

In May 2010, Pattillo premiered a concerto for beatbox flute, composed by Randall Woolf and performed with the UNCSA Symphony Orchestra. 

In India, Ashish Dadhich is the only Flute beatboxer who has been a winner of Josh World Famous App, 93.5 Red Fm's Tashanbaaz and he has also worked in netflix web series.

Sources

Music performance
Side-blown flutes
Beatboxing